Barredos (Los Barreros in Asturian) is one of nine parishes (administrative divisions) in Laviana, a municipality within the province and autonomous community of Asturias, in northern Spain. The population is 1,677 people.

Location
Barredos is 2 kilometers from the district capital, Pola de Laviana. It lies at 31 kilometers from Oviedo and 38 kilometers from Gijón.

History
The urban town of Barredos began as a mining town, with the rise of coal mining in this area of the Nalón mining zone. In the 1950s Barredos grew considerably with the construction of the workers' village. In recent years, population loss has been very significant. The still active Carrio well, in Hunosa, is within close proximity. Some mining paths run along old exploitation sites. Next to one of them is an old suspension bridge over the Nalón river, similar to the Vizcaya Bridge, in scale. The parish church, in the center of the workers' village, is dedicated to San José Obrero.

Barredos has a Primary School, a municipal sports center, a stopping station for the FEVE, and bus routes to the rest of the Nalón, Oviedo and Gijón Valleys. However, Barredos has not been able to contain its population loss as the low investment in urban improvement is evident.

External links
 Unofficial page
 Location, access and aerial view
 Page with news from the City Council

References

Parishes in Laviana